Lihi Lapid (born 12 May 1968) is an Israeli author, photojournalist, and newspaper columnist. She is an activist for people with disabilities. Her husband is Yair Lapid, the former Prime Minister of Israel.

Early life and education
Born as Lihi Mann and raised in Arad, Israel. Her family is of Ashkenazi Jewish descent who hails from Poland, Germany, and Austria.

Career
During her service in the Israel Defense Forces, Lapid was a photographer for Bamahane. She was a columnist at Yedioth Ahronoth for 15 years. In April 2019, after taking time off to campaign for her spouse, the newspaper would not hire her back. In 2008, she authored a novel and memoir titled Women of Valor.

Lapid is a feminist and an advocate for people with disabilities. She has an autistic daughter. Lapid is president of SHEKEL, a community organization for people with special needs.

Personal life
Lapid met her future spouse, Yair Lapid, while she was in the Israeli military. They have a son and daughter and reside in Ramat Aviv Gimel, Tel Aviv, Israel. She had two miscarriages and was on bed rest for six months before giving birth to her son.

Her religious affiliation was put into question by a Messianic Judaism preacher who claimed that she and her husband are also believers in Jesus though he later retracted his claim and apologized on video. In October 2022 an empty page appeared on her website titled "Jesus is definitely on the other side" which was immediately pulled and her website disabled by her team. A similar incident occurred in January 2022 when a web-defacement attack created a page containing Jesus in the title and gibberish in the article contents.

Selected works

References

External links

 

1968 births
Living people
People from Arad, Israel
Israeli women journalists
Israeli photojournalists
Israeli columnists
Israeli feminists
Israeli women activists
Israeli disability rights activists
Israeli people of Polish-Jewish descent
Israeli women columnists
Thelma Yellin High School of Arts alumni
20th-century Israeli women writers
21st-century Israeli women writers